Genevieve Lacey (born 1972) is an Australian musician and recorder virtuoso, working as a performer, creator, curator and cultural leader. The practice of listening is central to her works, which are created collaboratively with artists from around the world. Lacey plays handmade recorders made by Joanne Saunders and Fred Morgan. In her collection, she also has instruments by David Coomber, Monika Musch, Michael Grinter, Paul Whinray and Herbert Paetzold.

Early life and education
Born in the Highlands of Papua New Guinea, the third of four children of Ann and Roderic Lacey, Genevieve and her family moved to Australia in 1980. They lived in Canberra for one year where all the Lacey children learnt music from Judith Clingan. In 1981 the family moved to Ballarat, Victoria, where Lacey completed school, and studied recorder with Helen Fairhall and oboe with Joanne Saunders. She moved to Melbourne to attend the University of Melbourne from 1991 to 1994, studying English Literature and Music (recorder with Ruth Wilkinson, oboe with Stephen Robinson). She then moved to Basel, Switzerland, where she undertook postgraduate studies in medieval and renaissance music at the Schola Cantorum Basiliensis (1995–96). Relocating to Denmark to attend the Carl Nielsen Academy of Music, Odense (1996–98), she received a Diploma in recorder performance in the class of Dan Laurin. She returned to Australia in 1998, and completed a doctorate at the University of Melbourne (1999-2001). She has since been based in Melbourne.

Career as a recorder virtuoso
As a recorder virtuoso, Lacey has performed at the [Lindau International Convention of Nobel Laureates, for Queen Elizabeth II in Westminster Abbey, on a basketball court on Thursday Island with Australian indigenous ensemble The Black Arm Band, as a concerto soloist in the Royal Albert Hall for BBC Proms and at the opening night of the London Jazz Festival. She has appeared as a soloist with orchestras including Australian Chamber Orchestra, City of London Sinfonia, Kymi and Tapiola Sinfonietta Finland, Concerto Copenhagen, English Concert, Academy of Ancient Music, St Petersburg Chamber Orchestra, Korean Symphony Orchestra, Malaysian Philharmonic Orchestra, Australian Brandenburg Orchestra, Melbourne Chamber Orchestra, and the Melbourne, Adelaide, West Australian, Tasmanian and Queensland Symphony Orchestras. Lacey has performed chamber music with artists such as James Crabb, Marshall McGuire, Jane Gower and Lars Ulrik Mortensen, Paolo Pandolfo, Poul Høxbro, Paul Grabowsky, Neal Peres Da Costa and Daniel Yeadon, Karin Schaupp, Flinders Quartet and Elision Ensemble, and has appeared at festivals including Sound Unbound (Barbican), Paris Festival d'Automne, Klangboden Wien, Seoul International Music Festival, and at Cheltenham, Huddersfield, Copenhagen Summer, Montalbane, the MaerzMusik festival in Berlin and all the major Australian arts festivals.

Lacey has also made an extensive contribution to contemporary recorder repertoire, commissioning and premiering works by composers as wide-ranging as Australians Liza Lim, Elena Kats-Chernin, Brett Dean, Lou Bennett, Andrea Keller, Hollis Taylor, Paul Grabowsky, Ben Frost, as well as Erkki-Sven Tuur (Estonia), John Surman (UK), Max de Wardener (UK), Jason Yarde (UK), Jan Bang (Norway), Christian Fennesz (Germany) and Nico Muhly (USA).

Creations: solo and collaborative projects
Lacey's creations combine her skills as a performer, composer and curator. Her works are experienced in a wide variety of contexts and often connect people and ideas. Current collaborators include filmmakers Amos Gebhardt and Sophie Raymond, writers Alexis Wright and Chloe Hooper, choreographers Gideon Obarzanek and Stephanie Lake, ornithologist/composer Hollis Taylor and Antarctic scientist Steven Chown. Lacey's recent collaborations include multidisciplinary works Soliloquy (2018) and one infinity (2018) that both explore the powerful combination of music and movement. In Soliloquy, 40 untrained participants share the stage with a virtuoso musician and a professional dancer to radically re-invent the conventions of a solo recital. one infinity is a cross-cultural collaboration between musicians, dancers and choreographers from China, Australia and the United Kingdom that takes inspiration from the ancient Chinese tale of Zhi Yin. Lacey's creations also include Pleasure Garden (2016), a kinetic sound installation designed for visitors to experience while wandering through an outdoor or indoor garden, or verdant places. This collaboration is a fusion of music, field recordings and technology (including motion-tracking cameras), and combines 17th century melodies of Jacob van Eyck with contemporary electro-acoustic sound art. Her film collaborations include animated documentary film Recorder Queen (2020), directed by Sophie Raymond, an autobiographical journey of Lacey's creative life that explores the feelings of being a musician.

Works 
2010: Namatjira, theatre work and documentary film for Big hART 2010: En Masse, live music-film installation
2013: Conversations with Ghosts live concert and recording project with Australian singer-songwriter Paul Kelly
2014–2020: Recorder Queen, animated documentary film
2015: Life in Music, radio series for ABC Radio
2015: Acoustic Life of Sheds, a suite of new music, performed in sheds for Big hART
2016: Pleasure Garden, a kinetic sound installation experienced by 30,000+ people in Australia and Europe
2018: one infinity, cross-cultural music-dance performance
2018: Soliloquy, participatory music-dance ritual
2020: Solveig, music-film-installation

Artistic director–curator 
Lacey is artistic director for Finding Our Voice, was a member of the curatorial team for Rising 2019–20, is the artistic advisor to UKARIA, and was the chamber music curator of A Brief History of Time for the 2019 Adelaide International Arts Festival. In 2018, she was the artist in residence for the Melbourne Recital Centre, and the curator and artistic director for the Whoever You Are Come Forth celebrations for the centenary of St Mary's College, University of Melbourne. Other curatorial roles include the inaugural curator for UKARIA 24 in 2016, creator, curator and presenter for Words and Music at Wheeler Centre in 2014, and curating the live music program for the Art Music Awards, APRA-Australian Music Centre, 2013–2015. She was the artistic director for Musica Viva Australia's FutureMakers from 2015 to 2019, Four Winds Festival from 2008 until 2012, and the Melbourne Autumn Music Festival between 1999 and 2003. She has provided support and guidance to emerging artists as a creative and entrepreneurial mentor, with positions including mentoring for the Freedman Fellowship Finalists mentor 2019-2020 and the Australian National Academy of Music's Fellowship program between 2014 and 2016.

Discography

Albums

Filmography

Publications
McKinnon, C. (2020). Adelaide Festival 60 Years. Amsterdam University Press.
 Lacey, Genevieve (2021). 'Life in Music', in Creative Research in Music: Informed Practice, Innovation and Transcendence (1st ed.). Routledge.

Awards and nominations

AIR Awards
The Australian Independent Record Awards (commonly known informally as AIR Awards) is an annual awards night to recognise, promote and celebrate the success of Australia's Independent Music sector.

! 
|-
| 2022
| Bower (with Marshall McGuire)
| Best Independent Classical Album or EP
|  
|

ARIA Music Awards

The ARIA Music Awards is an annual awards ceremony that recognises excellence, innovation, and achievement across all genres of Australian music.

! 
|-
|2001
|Il Flauto Dolce  (with Australian Brandenburg Orchestra and Paul Dyer)
|Best Classical Album
| 
|
|-
|2002
|Piracy: Baroque music stolen for the recorder (with Linda Kent)
|Best Classical Album
| 
|
|-
|2013
|Conversations with Ghosts (with Paul Kelly, James Ledger & ANAM Musicians)
|Best Original Soundtrack/Cast/ Show Album
| 
|
|-
|2015
|Heard This and Thought of You (with James Crabb)
|Best World Music Album
| 
|
|-
|2019
|Soliloquy: Telemann Solo Fantasia
|Best Classical Album
| 
||
|-
| 2021
| Bower (with Marshall McGuire)
| Best Classical Album 
| 
|
|-
|}

Australian Women in Music Awards
The Australian Women in Music Awards is an annual event that celebrates outstanding women in the Australian Music Industry who have made significant and lasting contributions in their chosen field. They commenced in 2018.

|-
| 2021
| Genevieve Lacey
| Excellence in Classical Music Award
|

National Live Music Awards
The National Live Music Awards (NLMAs) are a broad recognition of Australia's diverse live industry, celebrating the success of the Australian live scene. The awards commenced in 2016.

|-
| National Live Music Awards of 2019
| Genevieve Lacey
| Live Classical Act of the Year
| 
|-

Sidney Myer Performing Arts Awards
The Sidney Myer Performing Arts Awards commenced in 1984 and recognise outstanding achievements in dance, drama, comedy, music, opera, circus and puppetry.

|-
| 2018 || Genevieve Lacey || Individual Award || 
|-

Other awards
 Green Room for best composition and sound design for one infinity, with Max de Wardener, Wang Peng, Jim Atkins 2019
Estonian Music Best Classical Recording 2018 for Tüür Illuminatio
Fellowship, Australia Council for the Arts, Music Board 2012–2013
Excellence in a Regional Area, Art Music Awards APRA-AMC – Four Winds Festival 2011
Helpmann Award, best touring production – Namatjira 2012
State Award for Excellence, Art Music Awards APRA-AMC – En Masse 2011
 Outstanding Musician, Melbourne Prize for Music 2007
Best performance, Art Music Awards APRA-AMC – Ledger's Line Drawing 2006
Churchill Fellowship 2006
Music Council of Australia/Freedman Fellowship for Australian performer of superb achievement 2001
Helen M. Schutt Scholarship, most highly ranked female research student 1999
Most outstanding graduate, Carl Nielsen Academy of Music, Denmark 1998
First place, Dean's Honours List, Faculty of Music, University of Melbourne, 1994
Welsford Smithers Travelling Scholarship, University of Melbourne 1994
Queen's Trust Award for outstanding young Australians 1994
Catherine Grace McWilliam Prize for most outstanding graduate, University of Melbourne 1994

Honorary positions 
Chair, Board of Directors, Australian Music Centre, 2016–21; Advisory Council, The New Approach (Myer, Fairfax, Keir Foundations), 2018; Board of Directors, The New Approach 2021 -; Director, Four Winds Festival Foundation Board, 2018–2020; International Jury Member, Classical:NEXT, 2017; Advisory Panel, UKARIA, 2015–2017; Peer Assessment Panel, Australia Council for the Arts, 2015–2020; Board of Directors, Australian Music Centre, 2013–2015; Advisory Panel, Black Arm Band, 2011–2015; Judging Panel, City of Melbourne Arts Grants, 2011–2020; Advisory Committee, Australian Music Centre, 2010–2012; Judging Panel, Sidney Myer Performing Arts Award, 2008–2009; Board of Directors, Elision Ensemble, 2008–2015; Board of Directors, Astra Chamber Music Society, 2006–2012; Board of Directors, Australian Music Centre, 2006–2010; Judging Panel, Ian Potter Composer Fellowship Award, 2005–2007; Artistic Review Panel, Musica Viva Australia, 2004–2008; Honorary Fellow, University of Melbourne, 2002–2020.

References

External links

Living people
1972 births
21st-century Australian musicians
Australian recorder players
Australian expatriates in Switzerland
Papua New Guinean emigrants to Australia
Schola Cantorum Basiliensis alumni
University of Melbourne alumni
20th-century Australian musicians
20th-century classical musicians
21st-century classical musicians
20th-century women musicians
21st-century women musicians
ARIA Award winners
20th-century flautists
21st-century flautists